Tân Bình may refer to several places in Vietnam, including:

Tân Bình District, an urban district of Ho Chi Minh City
Tân Bình, Hải Dương, a ward of Hải Dương
Tân Bình, Ninh Bình, a ward of Tam Điệp
Tân Bình, Bình Phước, a ward of Đồng Xoài
Tân Bình, Dĩ An, a ward of Dĩ An in Bình Dương Province
Tân Bình, Tuyên Quang, a township of Yên Sơn District
Tân Bình, Tây Ninh City, a commune of Tây Ninh in Tây Ninh Province
Tân Bình, Thái Bình, a commune of Thái Bình
Tân Bình, Bình Thuận, a commune of La Gi
Tân Bình, Tiền Giang, a commune of Cai Lậy
Tân Bình, Bến Tre, a commune of Mỏ Cày Bắc District
Tân Bình, Bắc Tân Uyên, a commune of Bắc Tân Uyên District in Bình Dương Province
Tân Bình, Đồng Nai, a commune of Vĩnh Cửu District
Tân Bình, Châu Thành, a commune of Châu Thành District, Đồng Tháp Province
Tân Bình, Thanh Bình, a commune of Thanh Bình District in Đồng Tháp Province
Tân Bình, Gia Lai, a commune of Đắk Đoa District
Tân Bình, Hậu Giang, a commune of Phụng Hiệp District
Tân Bình, Long An, a commune of Tân Thạnh District
Tân Bình, Quảng Ninh, a commune of Đầm Hà District
Tân Bình, Tân Biên, a commune of Tân Biên District in Tây Ninh Province
Tân Bình, Thanh Hóa, a commune of Như Xuân District
Tân Bình, Trà Vinh, a commune of Càng Long District
Tân Bình, Vĩnh Long, a commune of Bình Tân District, Vĩnh Long Province